The Tibetan Election Commission of the Central Tibetan Administration has confirmed that the procedure set for the preparation of the next general elections of 2021 is underway, according to a statement by Wangdu Tsering Pesur, chief electoral commissioner.

Wangdu Tsering has indicated that the worsening COVID-19 pandemic could cause problems, but hopes for an improvement.

Regarding independent or NGO-based candidacy announcement, Wangdu Tsering Pesur recalled the Election Commission (EC) guidelines: “We have been very clear in the guidelines about candidature announcements, in that only EC declares the names of the candidates contesting elections. Even though there have been some announcements through social media on the basis of support and strength of certain individuals, we urge the community to adhere to the EC guidelines as has been done up until now.".

The term of the current cabinet headed by Dr. Lobsang Sangay, who has served for two consecutive terms, will end with his retirement as Sikyong in May 2021.

Sikyong Candidates 

The first Tibetans to publicly announce their proposed candidacy for the highest office in Tibetan politics "Sikyong" are former minister Dolma Gyari; former minister, representative of Dalai Lama in the America and acting president of the Tibet Fund - Lobsang Nyandak; and member of parliament Acharya Yeshi Phuntsok.

Thereafter, Kelsang Dorjee Aukatsang, Tashi Wangdu, and Penpa Tsering announced their candidacy for the election of Sikyong on September 2, 2020. Ngodup Dongchung announced his candidacy on September 9, and Tashi Topgyal, on September 10.

Smartvote Tibet 

Throughout 2020, a civil society initiative called Smartvote Tibet invited Tibetans to submit questions for Sikyong and MP candidates in order to build an informed electorate. Smartvote Tibet is an initiative formed by a group of Tibetans who have a background in political science, history, psychology, technology and human rights law. Once the public submit questions on a wide range of current issues, the candidates answer them. Then, voters can answer the same set of questions after which they receive a list of candidates that best match their preferences.

The project smartvote Tibet was covered by Tibetan media outlets such as Radio Free Asia, Voice of Tibet and Phayul. In a piece profiling younger candidates, Indian media outlet Mint mentioned smartvote. An article about the advantages and challenges of smartvote Tibet was written by team member Sonam Palmo Brunner and published by Global Voices.

The platform is an adapted version of smartvote, which was first developed in 2003 by Politools in Switzerland. The tool has been successfully implemented for regional and national elections in Switzerland, Australia, Luxembourg, Austria, Scotland as well as in the European Union.

Dates 

The primary election of Sikyong and MPs is announced for January 3, 2021, with the results set to finalize by February 8. Hundreds of voters, most wearing facemasks, using hand sanitzer, and maintaining social distancing, voted in Dharamshala, India.

Following the initial primary, the two Sikyong candidates receiving the highest vote share move on the second round. The date for the second round is set for March 20.

References

See also 
 Central Tibetan Administration

Central Tibetan Administration elections
Central Tibetan Administration
Tibet
January 2021 events in China
February 2021 events in China
April 2021 events in China
2021 Central Tibetan Administration general election